Novy Kainlyk (Yañı Qayınlıq) is a rural locality (a selo) and the administrative centre of Novokainlykovsky Selsoviet, Krasnokamsky District, Bashkortostan, Russia. The population was 615 as of 2010. There are 5 streets.

Geography 
Novy Kainlyk is located 52 km southeast of Nikolo-Beryozovka (the district's administrative centre) by road. Redkino is the nearest rural locality.

References 

Rural localities in Krasnokamsky District